The Bear's Island is a French animated television series produced by Pixibox and first aired in 1992. It was one of the first animated films which heavily involved computer animation.

Plot
Eddie is a white bear with a mask that lives on Rabbit's Island. One day little Ghost tells him that he is a bear and about the Island of the Bears. He leaves in a balloon with his friend Max (a rabbit) in search of the Bear's Island.

Characters
Eddie: a white bear wearing a mask
Little Max: Eddie's rabbit friend
OC: a ghost that lives in a bottle
Baron: a rose

Members of the 4 elements
 The storm bird: He is the first villain of the four they meet. This takes place in the clouds. He plays the organ and divides into a flock of grey birds when he moves.
 The siren Lodine: She lives on an iceberg. She moves in a bathtub carried by servants when she is out of the water.
 The witch Marveline: She lives in a volcano. She was the most determined to stop Eddie because of a prophecy. This prophecy says that the power of the four elements would be lost if something happened with Bear's Island. It is possible that they made the island disappear because of this prophecy. From the start of the series, she monitors them and causes trouble.
 The tropical monkey: He has a personal army of Vampire Dragon. He lived in the jungle and represents industrialization and pollution. He was building a fleet of aircraft in a bizarre series and throws acid.

References

1990s French animated television series
1992 French television series debuts
1992 French television series endings
French children's animated adventure television series
Animated television series about bears